Strange Cargo is a 1936 British crime film directed by Lawrence Huntington and starring Kathleen Kelly, George Mozart and Moore Marriott. The film is notable for an early performance by George Sanders who went on to success in Hollywood. It was made at British and Dominions Elstree Studios for release by Paramount Pictures. It is also known by the alternative title Breakers Ahead. Criminal gun runners smuggle illegal arms onto a British ship at a South American port. (The film shares a title—but nothing else—with the 1940 Clark Gable/Joan Crawford drama Strange Cargo.)

Cast
 Kathleen Kelly as Sonia 
 George Mozart as 'Orace  
 Moore Marriott as Captain Burch  
 George Sanders as Roddy Burch 
 Richard Norris as Travers  
 Geoffrey Clarke as Rev. Twiddell  
 Kenneth Warrington as Captain Mandera  
 Julian Vedey as Customs Officer  
 Adèle as herself 
 Matt Davidson as  Himself
 Harry Lane
 Conway Palmer 
 Alvin Saxon as himself and His Murray Club Band

References

Bibliography
Chibnall, Steve. Quota Quickies: The Birth of the British 'B' Film. British Film Institute, 2007.
Low, Rachael. Filmmaking in 1930s Britain. George Allen & Unwin, 1985.
Wood, Linda. British Films, 1927–1939. British Film Institute, 1986.

External links

1936 films
British crime films
British black-and-white films
1936 crime films
Seafaring films
Films directed by Lawrence Huntington
Films set in South America
British and Dominions Studios films
Films shot at Imperial Studios, Elstree
1930s English-language films
1930s British films